The 1899 Yale Bulldogs football team represented Yale University in the 1899 college football season. The team compiled a 7–2–1 record, recorded eight shutouts, and outscored all opponents by a total of 191 to 16. The team defeated Wisconsin (6–0), Army (24–0), and Penn State (42–0), played a scoreless tie against Harvard, and lost to Columbia (0–5) and Princeton (10–11).

The loss to Columbia at Manhattan Field was described by The New York Times as "one of the most disastrous defeats Yale has ever experienced in her athletic history." Columbia's freshman back Harold Weekes scored the game's only points on a 50-yard touchdown run in the middle of the second half. A relative unknown in 1899, Weekes was selected as a consensus All-American in 1901 and was later inducted into the College Football Hall of Fame.

Harvard and Princeton are recognized as the national champions for the 1899 season. Yale played the former to a scoreless tie and lost by one point to the latter. The loss to Princeton was decided with one minute left in the game by a dropkicked field goal (then worth five points) from the 35-yard line by Princeton's All-American Art Poe.

Four Yale players (halfback Albert Sharpe, fullback Malcolm McBride, tackle George S. Stillman and guard Gordon Brown) were consensus picks for the 1899 College Football All-America Team.

The team's head coach was James O. Rodgers who had played for Yale from 1894 to 1897. He was announced as the head coach on September 28, 1899, just two days before the season opened. Rodgers was at the time a student at Harvard Law School and was unable to devote his full time to coaching the team.  Rodgers was assisted as the team's coach by Walter Camp and Fred Murphy.

Schedule

References

Yale
Yale Bulldogs football seasons
Yale Bulldogs football